Bossiaea smithiorum is a species of flowering plant in the family Fabaceae and is endemic to the south-west of Western Australia. It is a slender shrub with oblong to cylindrical leaves and orange-yellow and red or purple, pea-like flowers.

Description
There are similar bracteoles on the pedicels but that fall off as the flower develops. Muelleria 23: |journal=Muelleria |date=2006 |volume=11 |pages=77–78 |url=https://www.biodiversitylibrary.org/item/278250#page/79/mode/1up |access-date=6 September 2021}}</ref>

Taxonomy and namingBossiaea smithiorum was first formally described in 1994 by James Henderson Ross in the journal Muelleria from specimens collected near Wattengutten Hill, east of Wongan Hills in 1993. The specific epithet (smithiorum) honours Basil and Mary Smith for their contributions to the study of the genus Bossiaea.

Distribution and habitat
This bossiaea grows in low Eucalyptus woodland, often in the runoff zone near granite outcrops in the Avon Wheatbelt and Mallee biogeographic regions of south-western Western Australia.

Conservation statusBossiaea smithiorum'' is classified as "not threatened" by the Western Australian Government Department of Biodiversity, Conservation and Attractions.

References

smithiorum
Mirbelioids
Flora of Western Australia
Plants described in 2006